Pat Cowan may refer to:

 Patrick Cowan (born 1986), American football quarterback
 Pat Cowan (politician) (1943–2006), politician in Newfoundland